Gilmore or Gillmore may refer to:

Gilmore (surname)

Places

Australia
Gilmore, Australian Capital Territory, a suburb in the Canberra district of Tuggeranong
Gilmore Avenue, a road in southern Perth, Western Australia
Division of Gilmore, an Australian Electoral Division in New South Wales

Canada
Gilmore station (SkyTrain), a SkyTrain station in Burnaby, British Columbia

Philippines
Gilmore Avenue, Quezon City
Gilmore station (Line 2), a railway station on the Manila Line 2 in Quezon City, Philippines

United States
Gilmore, Arkansas
Gilmore, Idaho
Gilmore, Maryland
Gilmore, Missouri
Gilmore, Nebraska
Gilmore, Ohio
Gilmore, Oklahoma
Gilmore City, Iowa
Gilmore Township, Benzie County, Michigan
Gilmore Township, Isabella County, Michigan
Gilmore Township, Greene County, Pennsylvania
Gilmore Creek, a river in Kansas
Gilmore Field, a minor league baseball park in Los Angeles, California
Gilmore Lake, a backcountry lake in the Sierra Nevada of California
Gilmore Stadium, a former stadium in Los Angeles, California

Schools and museums 
Gilmore Car Museum, a museum located in Hickory Corners, Michigan, United States
Gilmore Community School, an elementary school in Burnaby, British Columbia, Canada
Gilmore Elementary School, an elementary school in Richmond, British Columbia, Canada

Other 
Gilmore Commission, U.S. Congressional Advisory Panel to Assess Domestic Response Capabilities for Terrorism Involving Weapons of Mass Destruction
Gilmore (1824 ship), transported settlers and convicts from England to Australia
USS Gilmore (DE-18), an Evarts-class short-hull destroyer escort
Gillmore Medal, a military decoration of the United States Army
Gilmore Girls, an American television series that ran from 2000 to 2007
Gilmore the lion, a flying lion

See also
Gillmor
Gilmor
Gilmour (disambiguation)